Callomecyna leehsuehae is a species of beetle in the family Cerambycidae. It was described by Yamasako and Chou in 2014.

References

Apomecynini
Beetles described in 2014